Blairgowrie Community Hospital is a health facility in Perth Road, Blairgowrie and Rattray, Scotland. It is managed by NHS Tayside.

History
The first donation to the hospital was a legacy from Mrs Clerk-Rattray in 1882. Subsequently, Mrs Macpherson of Newton Castle gifted the site and further donations were then forthcoming. The facility, which was designed by L & J G Falconer, opened as Blairgowrie and Rattray Districts Cottage Hospital in May 1901. An additional wing was added in 1940 and, after joining the National Health Service in 1948, a GP unit was established on the site in 2014.

References

Hospitals in Perth and Kinross
Hospital buildings completed in 1901
1901 establishments in Scotland
Hospitals established in 1901
NHS Scotland hospitals
Blairgowrie and Rattray